Praveen Kumar (born 1986) is an Indian cricketer from Uttar Pradesh.

Praveen Kumar may also refer to:

Praveen Kumar Sobti (1947-2022), Indian film and television actor, former discus thrower and politician.
Praveen Kumar (Para athlete) (born 2003), Indian para athlete who won silver in 2020 Tokyo Paralympics.
Praveen Kumar (Mangalore politician), former mayor of Mangalore City Corporation
Praveen Kumar (Delhi politician) (born 1984), member of the Sixth Legislative Assembly of Delhi
R. S. Praveen Kumar (born 1967), retired Indian Policeman